Mkapa is a surname. Notable people with the surname include:

Anna Mkapa, former First Lady of Tanzania
Benjamin Mkapa (1938–2020), Tanzanian politician
Dunstan Mkapa (born 1948), Tanzanian politician 

Surnames of African origin